Whitnall High School is a comprehensive secondary school in Milwaukee County, Wisconsin. It is part of the Whitnall School District. It is named for Charles B. Whitnall, the first Socialist City Treasurer of Milwaukee and the architect of Milwaukee County's system of public parks.

Administration 
Whitnall High School has  three  administrators. Charles Tollefsen is the principal, Russell Tillmann is the assistant principal, and Elizabeth Purse is the dean of students as of 2019.

Academic reputation 
According to the school's own records, the average ACT composite score for the 2007-08 school year was 23.2, which is slightly higher than the state average of 22.3. The ACT examination is a nationally administered college entrance examination.  A score of 23.2 falls in the 69th percentile nationwide.

The most recent results from the Wisconsin Knowledge and Concepts Examination of 10th graders at Whitnall High School indicate that 83% of students score at the proficient or advanced level in reading.  86% of student score at the proficient or advanced level in science, and 83% of students score at the proficient or advanced level in mathematics.

Sports 

WHS is a member of the Woodland-East Conference.  Schools in that conference include Brown Deer, Cudahy, Greenfield, Milwaukee Lutheran, South Milwaukee, and Shorewood.

During the 2015-2016 school year, the school's varsity football program tied as Woodland East Conference champions, the 4th championship in school history.

Sports offered at WHS:

Boys Cross Country
Girls Cross Country
Boys Volleyball
Girls Volleyball
Boys Soccer
Girls Soccer
Football
Girls Tennis
Boys Tennis
Girls Swimming
Boys Swimming
Boys Basketball
Girls Basketball
Wrestling
Boys Golf
Boys Track
Girls Track
Baseball
Softball

Notable alumni 
 Lisa Brescia, actress
 Tyler Herro, basketball player
 Jeana Keough, actress
 Joel Stave, football player

References 

1959 establishments in Wisconsin
Educational institutions established in 1959
Public high schools in Wisconsin
Schools in Milwaukee County, Wisconsin